The Newcastle 500 (known for sponsorship reasons as the Thrifty Newcastle 500) is an annual motor racing event for Supercars, held at the Newcastle Street Circuit in Newcastle, New South Wales, Australia since 2017. The event was not held in 2020, 2021 and 2022 due to the COVID-19 pandemic, but returned in 2023 as the season-opener.

Format
The event is staged over a three-day weekend, from Friday to Sunday. Three fortyfive-minute practice sessions are held on Friday. Saturday a twenty-minute qualifying session, succeeded by a top ten shootout, the combined results of which decides the grid positions for the following 250 kilometre race. A twenty-minute qualifying session is held on Sunday, succeeded by a top ten shootout, the combined results of which decide the grid for the following 250 km race.

History
From 2009 until 2016, the final event on the Supercars calendar was the Sydney 500 at the Sydney Olympic Park Street Circuit. Following the demise of the event, Supercars opened discussions with Destination NSW for a replacement event in the state. Initial plans for a race at Gosford on the state's Central Coast fell through after several months of negotiations, leaving Newcastle as the leading alternative.  In September 2016, Newcastle's place as the final event of the 2017 season was confirmed in an announcement made by Supercars CEO James Warburton and Premier Mike Baird. In December 2016, the track layout and a November 2017 date for the inaugural event were confirmed.

The first two events in 2017 and 2018 both saw close championship deciders involving Scott McLaughlin. The inaugural event culminated in the 2017 championship being decided in the final minutes of the Sunday race with McLaughlin requiring no worse than an 11th-place finish to win the championship over Jamie Whincup after winning the Saturday race with Whincup 21st. McLaughlin was running in 11th on the penultimate lap of the final race before an incident with Craig Lowndes exiting the first corner. Following an immediate stewards review, McLaughlin was given a time penalty for the contact with Lowndes, which awarded a record seventh championship to Whincup.

McLaughlin again entered the 2018 event in championship contention, this time against Whincup's team-mate Shane van Gisbergen. In the Saturday race, van Gisbergen overtook McLaughlin on the final lap as McLaughlin ran low on fuel. Van Gisbergen was then given a post-race penalty for a pitlane infringement which pushed him to fifth in the final results. McLaughlin then finished second in the Sunday race to secure his first championship title, only conceding the race lead in the late stages to David Reynolds, who scored the most points at the event for the second consecutive year. The result meant that the Ford Falcon won the championship in its final scheduled championship entry and the event was also the final drive of Craig Lowndes' full-time career.

The planned 2020 event was cancelled due to the COVID-19 pandemic, and was again excluded from the 2021 calendar. It was confirmed in December 2020 that the event would be the opening round of the 2022 Supercars Championship in early 2022. However, due to the outbreak of the Omicron variant of COVID-19, the 2022 event was cancelled, with the event later confirmed to return as the opening round of the 2023 Supercars Championship.

The 2023 event saw Shane van Gisbergen initially win the season-opening Saturday race, ahead of Triple Eight Race Engineering team-mate Broc Feeney, only for the pair to have their results annulled due to a technical breach which occurred in pit lane; this saw Cameron Waters, who initially finished in third place, promoted to the top of the podium.

Winners

Multiple winners

By driver

By team

By manufacturer

Criticism
Before the first running of the event, many local residents raised concerns about the implications of the event's running in this area of the city. Up to 140 residents staged a protest resulting in clashes against Supercars fans, among concerns about noise restrictions and lack of access during the race weekend. During the inaugural race weekend, NSW Police were called to a trackside unit following reports that a support category was egged.

Concerts
The Newcastle 500 event and circuit precinct has and will play host to various music acts as part of the "Rock and Race" format. In 2017 the concerts were held in Foreshore Park within the confines of the circuit, while from 2018 onwards concerts have been scheduled to be held at Newcastle Number 1 Sports Ground, 3.5 km away. Bands and band tours to have been conducted in tandem with the event include:
2017: Delta Goodrem, The Veronicas, Cold Chisel, Spiderbait, The Owls
2018: Simple Minds, Birds of Tokyo, The Delta Riggs

In 2019, Kiss were scheduled to headline a concert including The Screaming Jets as part of their End of the Road World Tour before it was cancelled along with the other Australian and New Zealand tour dates.

Event sponsors
2017–19: Coates Hire
2023–: Thrifty

See also
List of Australian Touring Car Championship races

References

 
Motorsport in New South Wales
Recurring sporting events established in 2017
Sport in Newcastle, New South Wales
Supercars Championship races
2017 establishments in Australia